Gergő Bruckmann (born 14 July 1995) is a Hungarian modern pentathlete. He participated at the 2018 World Modern Pentathlon Championships, winning a medal.

References

External links

Living people
1995 births
Hungarian male modern pentathletes
World Modern Pentathlon Championships medalists
Place of birth missing (living people)
20th-century Hungarian people
21st-century Hungarian people